Nation Ford High School (NFHS) is a public high school in Fort Mill, South Carolina. It is part of the York County School District 4. It takes its name from the historic Nation Ford Road.

Academics
The school is accredited by both the state of South Carolina as well as the Southern Association of Colleges and Schools. It offers over 200 courses, including advanced placement, dual credit, honors, college-preparatory and applied technology courses.

Athletics
Nation Ford High School is a member of the SCHSL. Athletic teams include swim team, volleyball, softball, football, soccer, cross country, track, tennis, golf, lacrosse, wrestling, and basketball.

State championships 
 Lacrosse - Boys: 2022
 Softball: 2011
 Swimming - Boys: 2008
 Volleyball: 2010, 2018, 2019

Marching band 
The school's marching band was 2009, 2010, and 2011 South Carolina 3A State Marching Band Champions. The band has also won the 2013, 2015-2017, 2019 and 2021 state championships in the 4A category. Additionally, the school's band has marched in the Macy's Thanksgiving Day parade in 2011 and 2017.

Lastly, the band has a record of performances on the national stage with the BOA (Bands of America) organization. Performing regionally between 2011 and 2022, taking a short break in 2020 due to the COVID-19 virus. Of note, the band also won multiple regional championships from BOA competitions between 2013 and 2022, also taking a hiatus in 2020 due to the COVID-19 virus.

References

Schools in York County, South Carolina
Public high schools in South Carolina